Legislative elections were held in Mexico on 2 July 1967. The Institutional Revolutionary Party won 177 of the 212 seats in the Chamber of Deputies.

Results

References

Mexico
Legislative
Legislative elections in Mexico
July 1967 events in Mexico
Election and referendum articles with incomplete results